Grissmann is a surname. Notable people with the surname include:

Carla Grissmann (1928–2011), American humanitarian, writer, and educational reformer
Werner Grissmann (born 1952), Austrian alpine skier

See also
Grisman
Grossman